Dade-Collier Training and Transition Airport  is a public airport located within the Florida Everglades, 36 miles (58 km) west of the central business district of Miami, in Collier County, Florida, United States. It is owned by Miami-Dade County and operated by the Miami-Dade Aviation Department. The airport is on the Tamiami Trail near the border between Dade and Collier counties in central South Florida.

History

Begun in 1968 as the Everglades Jetport (also known as Big Cypress Jetport), the airport was planned to be the largest airport in the world, covering 39 square miles with six runways, and connected to both central Miami and the Gulf of Mexico by an expressway and monorail line. The airport would have been five times the size of JFK Airport in New York. At the time, the Boeing 2707 was under development and it was anticipated that supersonic aircraft would dominate long-haul air transportation. South Florida was viewed as an ideal location for an intercontinental SST hub due to the limitation that such aircraft would have to fly over water. Because of environmental concerns and the cancellation of the 2707 program, construction was halted in 1970 after the completion of just one 10,500' runway. The remaining land became the Big Cypress National Reserve.

Although the airport was left abandoned and unfinished, it was still retained by the local government as a general aviation airport and (to a greater extent) training airport. It was originally heavily used by Pan Am and Eastern Airlines as a training airport, as the long runway at Dade-Collier could accommodate aircraft as large as Boeing 747s, and was equipped with a relatively new instrument landing system, which allowed pilots to train for landing with low cloud ceilings and/or poor visibility. The isolation of the airport meant that it could be used for training flights 24/7 all days of the year without interfering with the traffic at Miami International. In more recent years, the advent of flight simulators has made such training flights less economical, and the airport is now used much less frequently, although it remains open to general aviation.

Facilities and aircraft 
For 2001, the airport had 14,468 general aviation aircraft operations, an average of 39 per day. As of 2015 the airport had an average of 12 landings and take-offs per day.

Other uses 
High-speed automobile events have been held here because the runway is two miles long. This allows exotic cars to break the  barrier, a pinnacle for street vehicles.  Such events were held in 2009, 2010 and 2011.

Oil exploration on the site was considered in 2009, but not pursued due to resistance from conservation groups.

The Carlos Gimenez administration proposed holding a regular "Miami International Air Show" at Dade-Collier, similar in concept to the Paris Air Show. Homestead Air Reserve Base had previously been considered, but the idea had been rejected by the US military.

References

External links 
  brochure from CFASPP
 

 Exotic Car Runway Event
 Photo gallery of runway racing by Exotics Rally
 240mph breaks speed record video

Airports in Miami-Dade County, Florida
Big Cypress National Preserve
1968 establishments in Florida